Emeric Dembroschi (born 6 October 1945) is a retired Romanian football striker.

Club career

Emerich Dembrovschi was born on 6 October 1945 in Câmpulung la Tisa, Romania and started to play football in the Romanian lower leagues at Foresta Sighet and Victoria Roman. In 1967 he was transferred at SC Bacău where he was wanted by coach Constantin Teașcă, helping the team promote in Divizia A, a competition in which he made his debut on 20 August 1967 under coach Nicolae Dumitru, representing SC Bacău in a 2–1 victory against Steaua București in which he scored a goal. During his period spent at SC Bacău, Dembrovschi made his debut in European competitions, playing 7 games in which he scored 5 goals in the 1969–70 Inter-Cities Fairs Cup, helping the club reach the quarter-finals where they were eliminated by Arsenal who would eventually win the competition. In 1974, Dembrovschi went to play for Politehnica Timișoara where he won the 1979–80 Cupa României and in the 1980–81 European Cup Winners' Cup he helped the team eliminate Celtic. Emerich Dembrovschi made his last Divizia A appearance on 17 June 1981, playing for Politehnica in a 1–1 against Chimia Râmnicu Vâlcea, having a total of 385 appearances and 108 goals scored in the competition, also having a total of 15 matches and 5 goals scored in European competitions (including 7 appearances and 5 goals scored in the Inter-Cities Fairs Cup). A book about him was written by Ilie Dobre, called Emeric Dembroschi - eroul de la Guadalajara (Emeric Dembroschi - The hero from Guadalajara).

International career
Emerich Dembrovschi played 26 matches and scored 8 goals for Romania, making his debut on 27 October 1968 under coach Angelo Niculescu in a 3–0 loss against Portugal at the successful 1970 World Cup qualifiers in which he made a total of six appearances scored a goal in a 1–1 against Greece. At the 1970 World Cup final tournament he was used by Angelo Niculescu in all the minutes of the three group matches as Romania did not advance to the next stage, scoring a goal in the last game which was a 3–2 loss against Brazil. For his performances at the Mexican World Cup, Dembrovschi was declared Romania's best player and he and the other 15 best players from the other national teams were part of a project which consisted of each of them having a statue near the Estadio Azteca which was never fulfilled, but a wooden statue of him was displayed in his native Câmpulung la Tisa. He played 6 matches and scored two goals at the 1972 Euro qualifiers, managing to reach the quarter-finals where Romania was defeated by Hungary, who advanced to the final tournament. Dembrovschi's last two games played for the national team were at the 1974 World Cup qualifiers, in the first one scoring a goal in a 2–0 against Albania, his last appearance taking place on 26 September 1973 in a 2–0 loss against East Germany.

For representing his country at the 1970 World Cup, Dembrovschi was decorated by President of Romania Traian Băsescu on 25 March 2008 with the Ordinul "Meritul Sportiv" – (The Medal "The Sportive Merit") class III.

International goals
Score column indicates score after each Dembrovschi goal.

Honours
SC Bacău
Divizia B: 1966–67
Politehnica Timişoara
Cupa României: 1979–80

Notes

References

External links

1945 births
Living people
People from Maramureș County
Romanian footballers
Olympic footballers of Romania
Romania international footballers
Liga I players
Liga II players
FC Politehnica Timișoara players
FCM Bacău players
Association football forwards
1970 FIFA World Cup players
Romanian football managers
FC Politehnica Timișoara managers
FC UTA Arad managers